The island nation of Trinidad and Tobago is one of the regions which makes up the West Indies cricket team. It has produced international cricketers in all forms of the game—Tests, One Day Internationals (ODIs) and Twenty20 Internationals (T20Is). Five players from Trinidad and Tobago were included in the West Indies's first ever Test match, against England in 1928. Nelson Betancourt became the first Trinidadian to captain the West Indies when he led the side against England in 1930. Of the nine other Trinidadians to have captained the West Indies, Brian Lara has led the side the most times in Tests with 47 appearances. Lara has captained the West Indies 125 times in ODIs, which is a West Indies record.

Lara has scored the most runs by a Trinidadian, and most runs by a West Indian overall, in Tests and ODIs. With 11,953 runs in Tests, Lara is seventh on the overall record list. Ian Bishop is tied with Shannon Gabriel for the most Test wickets by a Trinidadian with 161. Sonny Ramadhin and Mervyn Dillon are the only other Trinidadians to have taken 100 Test wickets. Dwayne Bravo has taken the most ODI wickets by a Trinidadian with 199. Mervyn Dillon, Ian Bishop and Ravi Rampaul have also taken over 100 ODI wickets. As well it was not until 1999, when Lincoln Roberts played a test match, that a Tobago born player represented the West Indies at international level.

Key
 Apps denotes the number of appearances the player has made.
 Runs denotes the number of runs scored by the player.
 Wkts denotes the number of wickets taken by the player.

Statistics correct as of: October 2022

Notes
 Guillen played 3 Tests for New Zealand.
 Lara played 4 ODIs and 1 Test for the ICC World XI.

See also
List of West Indies Test cricketers
List of West Indies ODI cricketers
List of West Indies Twenty20 International cricketers

References

Trinidad and Tobago
International cricketers from Trinidad and Tobago

International cricketers from Trinidad and Tobago